The Wilde Professorship of Mental Philosophy is a chair in philosophy at the University of Oxford. Its holder is elected to a Fellowship of Corpus Christi College.

The position was initially established in 1898 as a readership by an endowment from the engineer Henry Wilde. It was converted to a professorship in 2000, on the recommendation of the Literae Humaniores Board and with the concurrence of the General Board.

According to the University's statutes: "The Wilde Professor shall lecture and give instruction in Mental Philosophy, and shall from time to time lecture on the more theoretical aspects of Psychology."

Wilde Professors
2000–2006: John Campbell, later Willis S. and Marion Slusser Professor of Philosophy at the University of California, Berkeley
2006–2016: Martin Davies
2018-date: Michael Gerard Fitzgerald Martin

Notes

Professorships at the University of Oxford
2000 establishments in England
Corpus Christi College, Oxford
Lists of people associated with the University of Oxford
Professorships in philosophy